Stephen James Easterbrook (born 6 August 1967) is a British business executive. From March 2015 to November 2019, he was president and chief executive of McDonald's, the American fast food company.

On 1 November 2019, the board of directors voted to dismiss Easterbrook with immediate effect, due to evidence of a relationship with a staff member, which is a violation of company anti-fraternisation policies.

Early life
Stephen James Easterbrook was born on 6 August 1967 in Watford, England. He grew up in Watford and was educated at Watford Grammar School for Boys. He studied natural sciences at St Chad's College, Durham University, where he played cricket with fellow student Nasser Hussain, who would later become England cricket captain.

Career
After university, he trained as an accountant with Price Waterhouse. Easterbrook first worked for McDonald’s in 1993 as a manager in London. In 2011 he left to become CEO of PizzaExpress and then CEO of Wagamama, two British casual dining chains, before returning to McDonald’s in 2013.

On 1 March 2015, after being chief brand officer of McDonald's and its former head in the UK and northern Europe, he became the CEO of the company, succeeding Don Thompson, who stepped down on 28 January 2015. For 2016, Easterbrook's total compensation almost doubled to $15.4 million.

In November 2019, McDonald's board of directors voted to remove Easterbrook as CEO since he had violated corporate policies on personal conduct by entering into a relationship with a company employee. He was replaced as CEO by Chris Kempczinski, who had been president of McDonald's USA.

In August 2020, McDonald's filed suit against Easterbrook, accusing him of lying about the number and extent of his relationships with subordinate employees and seeking to recover his severance package of more than $40 million. The company claimed that Easterbrook had sexual relationships with three women in the year before he was fired and awarded one of these employees stock options worth hundreds of thousands of dollars. Easterbrook was also accused of using his corporate email account to receive and send sexually explicit photos and videos of various women (including the three alleged relationships). The lawsuit is seeking to change the reason for Easterbrook's removal to "for cause", allowing the company to recoup its severance payments.

In December 2021, it was reported that Easterbrook had returned $105 million in cash and stock to the company in one of the largest clawbacks in the history of corporate America. McDonalds said that "Mr. Easterbrook would return equity awards and cash, with a current value of more than $105 million, which he would have forfeited had he been truthful at the time of his termination and, as a result, been terminated for cause." It did not specify the proportion of cash and stock.

Personal life
He is divorced with three children, who visit McDonald's two or three times a month.  He lives in Illinois, and is a Watford FC football fan.

References

1967 births
British chief executives
British accountants
Living people
McDonald's people
People from Watford
People educated at Watford Grammar School for Boys
Alumni of St Chad's College, Durham
20th-century British businesspeople
21st-century British businesspeople